The Lawrence Correctional Center is a medium security adult male prison of the Illinois Department of Corrections in Sumner, Illinois. The prison was opened in November 2001 and has an operational capacity of 2,458 prisoners.

References

Prisons in Illinois
2001 establishments in Illinois